François Coty (born Joseph Marie François Spoturno; 3 May 1874 – 25 July 1934) was a French perfumer, businessman, newspaper publisher, politician and patron of the arts. He was the founder of the Coty perfume company, today a multinational. He is considered the founding father of the modern perfume industry.

In 1904, his first success, fragrance La Rose Jacqueminot launched his career. He soon started exporting perfumes from France, and by 1910 he had subsidiaries in Moscow, London and New York. During the 1917 Russian Revolution, his assets in Moscow, which consisted of stocks and funds were confiscated by the Soviet government, making him a lifelong enemy of Communism. 

By the end of World War I, his financial success made him one of the richest men in France, allowing him to act as patron of the arts, collect works of art,  historic homes and seek to play a political role.
In 1922, he gained control of daily newspaper Le Figaro. To check the growth of socialism and Communism in France, he founded two other daily papers in 1928.

In 1923 he was elected senator of Corsica, and was mayor of Ajaccio from 1931 to 1934.

Fearing the spread of communism, he subsidized various right-wing movements. In 1933, faced with a political class that he considered incapable, he published a reform of the State and founded his own movement Solidarité française, which became more radical after his death.

Early life and family 

Joseph Marie François Spoturno was born on 3 May 1874 in Ajaccio, Corsica. He was a descendant of Isabelle Bonaparte, an aunt of Napoleon Bonaparte. His parents were Jean-Baptiste Spoturno and Marie-Adolphine-Françoise Coti, both descendants of Genoese settlers who founded Ajaccio in the 15th century. His parents died when he was a child and the young François was raised by his great-grandmother, Marie Josephe Spoturno, and after her death, by his grandmother, Anna Maria Belone Spoturno, who lived in Marseille.

After spending some years in military service, François met a fellow Corsican named Emmanuel Arène. A politician, writer, and future senator, Arène became François's mentor, offering him a job in Paris as his secretary. In Paris, François married Yvonne Alexandrine Le Baron and took the more French-looking name Coty, a variation on his mother's maiden name. He also met Raymond Goery, a pharmacist who made and sold perfume at his Paris shop. Coty began to learn about perfumery from Goery and created his first fragrance, Cologne Coty.

Perfumer 

Through Arène, Coty met Léon Chiris, a senator and member of the Chiris family, longtime manufacturers and distributors of perfume. At the Chiris factories in Grasse, in 1903, Coty studied perfumery and began work on a fragrance, La Rose Jacqueminot. On his return to Paris in 1900, he visited the Exposition Universelle (1900), (event of the Belle Époque), got married and in 1904, Coty set off to sell his scents to department stores, boutiques, and barbershops, but initially met with little success.  His luck changed when he dropped a bottle of La Rose Jacqueminot on a countertop at the Grands Magasins du Louvre, the Parisian department store. Attracted by the scent, customers swarmed the area, demanding to buy the perfume. Coty's entire stock was gone in a few minutes and the store offered him a place on the selling floor for his products. The success of La Rose made Coty a millionaire and established him as a major player in the perfume world.

Coty recognized that an attractive bottle was essential to a perfume's success. Though La Rose came in a Baccarat bottle, Coty's most famous collaboration was with the great ceramist and jeweler René Lalique. Lalique designed the bottles for Coty's early scents, such as Ambre Antique and L'Origan, which became bestsellers. He also designed the labels for Coty perfume, which were printed on a gold background with raised lettering. Lalique's designs for Coty were in the Art Nouveau style that was prevalent in the period, and incorporated classic Art Nouveau themes such as nature, flowers, and female figures.

Besides pioneering the concept of bottle design, Coty was responsible for making perfume available to a mass market. Before Coty, perfume was considered a luxury item, affordable only to the very rich. Coty was the first to offer perfumes at many price points.
By combining natural essences and synthetic products from suppliers such as Firmenich, he was able to reduce the costs of production. He is considered as the creator of modern perfumery. His perfumes, in their Lalique and Baccarat bottles, were aimed at the luxury market, but he also sold perfume in smaller, plainer bottles affordable to middle and working-class women. Coty perfume bottles, though mass-produced, were carefully designed to convey an image of luxury and prestige. Coty also invented the idea of a fragrance set, a gift box containing identically scented items, such as a perfume and matching powder, soap, cream, and cosmetics.

Coty summed up his approach to business when he said:
Give a woman the best product to be made, market it in the perfect flask, beautiful in its simplicity yet impeccable in its taste, ask a reasonable price for it, and you will witness the birth of a business the size of which the world has never seen.

In 1908, Coty relocated his manufacturing headquarters to Suresnes, just outside Paris. He acquired property in the area and began to build what would become "La cité des Parfums", a large complex of laboratories and factories that manufactured his products. "La cité" had 9,000 employees and was able to manufacture up to 100,000 bottles a day. This allowed Coty to meet the burgeoning demand for his products in France and abroad. On the eve of the First World War, Coty perfumes were No. 1 in the world, with branches in Moscow, New York, London and Buenos Aires, and François Coty was already very rich. In 1913, his exclusive agent in the United States since 1910, Benjamin Levy, assisted him in the creation of Coty Inc. in Delaware.  In 1917, during the turmoil of the Russian Revolution, his stores, factories, stocks, accounts and deposits at the Crédit Lyonnais in Moscow (nearly 4 million francs at the time) were confiscated by the Bolsheviks.

After World War I, demand for French perfume grew at a rapid pace. Many American soldiers had been stationed in France during the war and they brought back Coty perfumes to their wives and relatives. Coty realized the importance of the lucrative American market and began to distribute his products in the United States.

In 1921, with the help of executive Jean Despres, Coty created an American subsidiary in New York to handle the assembly and distribution of its products in the American market.(Coty’s headquarters  at No. 714 Fifth Avenue is now a registered landmark after restoration of Lalique’s windows.) The American offices assembled their own Coty products from raw materials sent by the Parisian factories, thus avoiding the high tariffs on luxury products in the United States. This allowed Coty to offer more competitive prices on its products. Later, additional subsidiaries were established in the United Kingdom and Romania.

Coty soon expanded his product line to include cosmetics and skin care, and expanded his distribution network to Europe, Asia, and Latin America. By 1925, 36 million women worldwide used Coty face powders. His most popular product was his Air-spun face powder, launched in 1934. Coty collaborated with famous costume designer Léon Bakst to create the look of the Air-spun powder box. It became so popular that soon afterwards Coty launched the Air-spun powder scented with his most popular perfumes, such as L'origan and Emeraude.

Patronage 

Coty was one of the wealthiest men in France; in 1929, his fortune was estimated at US$34 million. His wealth allowed him to play a role during the années folles, financially funding  artistic, early aeronautic endeavours and scientific undertakings. 
His sponsorship included supporting his native Corsica, participating in the development of the electrical infrastructure for the city of Ajaccio, building affordable housing, and establishing a World War I monument. He provided financial support to the French Olympic committee for the 1928 Summer Olympics and toward the attempts of Costes and Bellonte to break aeronautic world records  by crossing the Atlantic from Paris To New York in 1930, and the tragic attempt by pilots Joseph Le Brix and René Mesmin, to break the world record for distance flying.
Coty’s contributions additionally supported the establishment of a new research laboratory for physicist Édouard Branly (radio communications forerunner) within the Catholic institute of Paris and provided support for numerous artists as well as the French Academy in Rome.

Newspaper publisher and politics 
In 1923, after a close race, Coty was elected senator of Corsica, but his victory proved short-lived. The French Senate annulled his election in 1924 after accusations of bribery.
 
In 1922, Coty bought Le Figaro, a prestigious conservative newspaper with an upper-class readership. Coty changed the newspaper's name to Figaro and moved its headquarters to the Rond-Point des Champs-Elysées. Under Coty's ownership, the journal, once moderately conservative, adopted an extreme right-wing stance on politics and the economy. Figaro printed many fierce anti-Communist articles, and was notorious for its strong opposition to the government.

In 1926, Coty worked with Prime Minister Raymond Poincaré to create a fund to stabilize the French currency. He offered to lend 100 million francs to the French government, but was left out of the group appointed to oversee the fund, possibly because of his controversial political views. He then took his money to New York and donated a sizable sum  to the French Hospital in New York.

Disappointed once again, in 1928, Coty launched L'Ami du peuple, a newspaper aimed at the working class. Priced much lower than other competing newspapers, it soon gained a huge readership. In a long series of articles in L'Ami du peuple, he wrote incendiary articles that did not go unnoticed; on 1 July 1933, he was found guilty in court for libel against Jewish war veterans' groups in France and in September 1933, he sent a telegram to the Geneva Jewish Community, in which he recanted his anti-Jewish charges and asked that the telegram be read at the Jewish Conference for a World Jewish Congress.

Coty gave financial support to what later became far-right organizations, such as the Faisceau and Croix-de-Feu, a World War I veterans organization; however, he ended his support after a few years. In 1933, surrounded by courtisans, parasites or scoundrels, misled by more seasoned politicians, he published a Reform of the State and founded his own movement: French Solidarity. After his death in July 1934, the movement became more radical.

Coty was a bonapartist, nationalist, fervent defender of a strong Republic with a preponderance of executive power, like a number of his fellow citizens, in this period of the Third Republic. He wrote two books: Against Communism, 1928 and Save our colonies, 1931. 
In his Reform of the State, he proposed the election of the President of the Republic by direct universal suffrage, including women's votes, with a term of seven years and the possibility of holding two terms, as well as the creation of a supreme court. These measures were in part, later adopted by the Fifth Republic, established by Charles de Gaulle in 1958.

The Stade François Coty in Ajaccio was named after him.

Personal life 
Coty and Yvonne had two children, Roland and Christiane. Despite his marriage, Coty was well known for his numerous mistresses and illegitimate children. He was known to house his lovers in Paris' Hotel Astoria, and to lavish money and gifts on them. His first mistress then second wife was Henriette Dieudé, a former Coty shopgirl who bore him five children. Coty's love life was widely publicized in the French liberal newspapers, to the detriment of his public image.

Coty had a penchant for acquiring and remodeling property. His first major purchase was the Château de Longchamp in 1906, near the Bois de Boulogne, once the property of the famous French civic planner, Georges-Eugène Haussmann. Coty used it as a laboratory in which to design his fragrances, bottles, packaging, and advertisements. The renovated Longchamp included a glass dome by Lalique and a stone tower designed by Gustave Eiffel.

In 1912, he bought the Château d'Artigny near Tours and set out to rebuild it. Over a period of 20 years, Coty rebuilt d'Artigny in a grandiose fashion, installing custom-built kitchens, ballrooms, and a large fresco depicting himself, his family, friends, and even his mistresses. During the 1920s, he resided with his family in a mansion at Avenue Raphael in the Bois de Boulogne, which Coty had rebuilt with etched-glass panels, a stair rail, and a glass ceiling designed by Lalique.

Coty's most famous acquisition was the hunting pavilion of Louveciennes near Saint-Germain-en-Laye, designed by Claude Nicholas Ledoux for Madame du Barry, mistress of Louis XV. Coty had Louveciennes rebuilt to match Ledoux's original plan, but enlarged it to include a perfume laboratory and a third story. He also bought the Château Saint-Hélène in Nice, the Villa Namouna in Beaulieu-sur-Mer, and Le Scudo in Ajaccio, Corsica. Though he owned multiple large residences, Coty often lived in a hotel on the Champs-Élysées. He was something of a recluse, disliking crowds of any kind, and hiding behind his public image.

After 1929, Coty's fortunes began to diminish considerably. Both Figaro and L'Ami du peuple had been losing money for years and his perfume business had been affected by the 1929 Wall Street crash. But it was his divorce that most contributed to his financial ruin.

In 1929, Yvonne divorced Coty and married Leon Cotnareanu. Their divorce settlement stipulated that Coty would pay his ex-wife several millions of francs in three installments, but in 1931 Coty defaulted on the last payment, citing financial hardship. Over the next few years, divorce courts ruled in favor of Yvonne, and granted her ownership of most of Coty's fortune and his newspapers.

He died in 1934 at his home in Louveciennes, of pneumonia and complications after an aneurysm.

In 1963, Yvonne sold Coty Inc. to pharmaceutical giant Pfizer, with the stipulation that no member of the Coty family would be involved in the company. Under Pfizer, the company began to distribute its perfumes almost exclusively through drugstores, instead of in department stores as it had previously done. In 1992, Pfizer sold Coty to the German company Joh. A. Benckiser GmbH, which owns it today.

List of creations 

François Coty was a pioneer in the field of perfumery, creating countless masterpieces, many now preserved in the archives of the Osmothèque. His most notable perfumes include:

 La Rose Jacqueminot, 1904: a floral perfume based on the Jacqueminot Rose
 L'Origan, 1905: (The Golden One) a floral oriental fragrance
 Ambre Antique 1905: a soft amber fragrance
 Cologne Cordon Vert, 1905
 L'Ambréine, 1906
 Jasmin de Corse, 1906
 La Violette Pourpre, 1906
 L'Effleurt, 1907
 Cologne Cordon Rouge, 1909
 Muguet, 1910: (Lily of the Valley)
 Lilas Blanc, 1910
 Styx, 1911
 Au Coeur des Calices, 1912
 L'Or, 1912
 Cyclamen, 1913
 L'Entraînement, 1913
 Iris, 1913
 Héliotrope, 1913

 Jacinthe, 1914
 Lilas Pourpre, 1914
 La Violette Ambrée, 1914
 L’Oeillet France 1914
 Chypre, 1917: named after the island of Cyprus, Chypre is based on a combination of bergamot, oakmoss, and labdanum. Chypre was one of Coty's greatest successes and gave its name to an entire fragrance family. Its novel structure spawned many variations, such as Guerlain's Mitsouko, Robert Piguet's Bandit, and Chanel Pour Monsieur.
 La Feuillaison, 1920
 Émeraude, 1921: (Emerald) an oriental fragrance, Émeraude is similar in composition to Guerlain Shalimar, which was released in 1925
 Idylle, 1922
 Paris, 1922: a floral fragrance
 Le Nouveau Cyclamen, 1922
 Knize Ten, 1924
 L'Aimant, 1927 (The Magnet) a floral aldehyde perfume, said to be Coty's reply to Chanel No. 5
 A Suma, 1934 with Vincent Roubert.

See also 
 French Third Republic
 Jean Despres

Bibliography 
 .
 .

References

External links
 Coty, Inc.
 Coty on Cosmetics and skin
 Association François Coty
 Perfume Projects Coty page
 
 Coty on Frick Art Reference Library

1874 births
1934 deaths
People from Ajaccio
Mayors of Ajaccio
Corsican politicians
French Senators of the Third Republic
Senators of Corsica
French cosmetics businesspeople
French billionaires
French art collectors
French nationalists
20th-century French newspaper publishers (people)
French newspaper founders
History of cosmetics
French perfumers
French male non-fiction writers
Coty Inc. people